Frederick Creek is a stream in Oregon County of the Ozarks of southern Missouri. It is a tributary of Eleven Point River.

Frederick Creek, also historically called "Frederick's Fork", has the name of an early settler.

See also
List of rivers of Missouri

References

Rivers of Oregon County, Missouri
Rivers of Missouri